Ruben Tatuli Altunyan (Armenian: Ռուբեն Թաթուլի Ալթունյան; 31 March 1939 – 21 November 2021) was an Armenian composer, violist, and conductor. He was the son of conductor Tatul Altunyan.

Selected works 
 String Quartet No. 1 (1962)
 Perpetuum Mobile (Անընդհատ շարժում) for violin and piano (1964)
 Concerto-Symphony (Կոնցերտ-Սիմֆոնիա; Концерт-Симфония) for violin, viola and symphony orchestra (1966)
 Sonata for violin and piano (1966)
 Sonata for cello solo (1977)
 Symphony (1980)
 String Quartet No. 2 (1996)
 Symphony for chamber orchestra (1997)
 Tamzara (Թամզարա) for symphony orchestra (2004)
 Book of Lamentations (Մատյան ողբերգության), Ballet-Oratorio after Gregory of Narek (2010)
 Piano Trio (2012)
 Khachatriana (Խաչատրիանա) for chamber orchestra (2013)

References

External links 
Ruben Altunyan at AllMusic
 

1939 births
2021 deaths
Armenian composers
Armenian conductors (music)
Armenian violists
People from Yerevan